Bill Holm may refer to:

Bill Holm (art historian) (born 1925), American artist, author and art historian
Bill Holm (poet) (1943–2009), American poet, essayist, memoirist, and musician from Minnesota

See also
Billy Holm (1912–1977), Major League Baseball catcher